Chenar-e Sofla (also Romanized as Chenār-e Soflá; also known as Bābājānī) is a village in Teshkan Rural District, Chegeni District, Dowreh County, Lorestan Province, Iran. At the 2006 census, its population was 29, in 6 families.

References 

Towns and villages in Dowreh County